Pam Dickerson (born January 14, 1953) is an American politician who served in the Georgia House of Representatives from 2011 to 2021.

References

1953 births
Living people
Democratic Party members of the Georgia House of Representatives
21st-century American politicians